The 1920 Thuringia state election was held on 20 June 1920 to elect the 53 members of the Landtag of Thuringia.

Results

References 

Thuringia
Elections in Thuringia